The Zee Cine Award Best Director is chosen via the public of India. The winners are announced in March.

The winners are listed below:

References

See also 
 Zee Cine Awards
 Bollywood
 Cinema of India

Zee Cine Awards